Louis Tellier (December 24, 1842 – June 17, 1935) was a Canadian lawyer, politician, and judge.

Biography
Born in Berthier-en-Haut, Canada East, the son of Zephirin and Luce (Ferland) Tellier, Tellier completed his classical education at Joliette College in Joliette, Quebec. He studied law with Hon. Louis François Georges Baby, Joliette, and finished with Hon. Hubert W. Chagnon, in Saint-Hyacinthe, Quebec. He was called to the Quebec Bar in 1866, and practiced law in St. Hyacinthe. He was appointed a Queen's Counsel in 1882. From 1863 to 1873, he was Deputy Prothonotary of the Superior Court, and Deputy Clerk of the Circuit Court for the district. From 1873 to 1878 he was a Crown Attorney.

He was elected to the House of Commons of Canada for St. Hyacinthe in the 1878 election; he then defeated Honoré Mercier who was running for the Liberal Party. A Conservative, he was defeated in the 1882 election.

In 1887, he was made a Judge of the Superior Court of the Province of Quebec for Saint-Hyacinthe district. In 1903, he was transferred to Montreal. Tellier retired from the bench in 1915.

In 1868, Tellier married Hermine Malhiot.

Louis Tellier is the brother of Sir Joseph-Mathias Tellier, who is the father of Maurice Tellier, and the grandfather of Paul Tellier. He is also a first cousin of Raymond Tellier, who is the grandfather of Luc-Normand Tellier.

Electoral record

References
 The Canadian album : men of Canada; or, Success by example, in religion, patriotism, business, law, medicine, education and agriculture; containing portraits of some of Canada's chief business men, statesmen, farmers, men of the learned professions, and others; also, an authentic sketch of their lives; object lessons for the present generation and examples to posterity (Volume 2) (1891-1896)

External links
 

1842 births
1935 deaths
Conservative Party of Canada (1867–1942) MPs
Members of the House of Commons of Canada from Quebec
Judges in Quebec
Lawyers in Quebec
Canadian King's Counsel